Shuqba cave is an archaeological site near the town of Shuqba in the western Judaean Mountains in the Ramallah and al-Bireh Governorate of the West Bank.

Location
Shuqba cave is located on the northern bank of Wadi en-Natuf. This wadi is a kilometer south of the town of Shuqba, and runs west towards the Mediterranean coastal plain. The town is 28 km northwest of Jerusalem. This area is within the Judaean Mountains.

History of exploration
The site was briefly investigated in 1924 by Father Alexis Mallon, who suggested that the British School of Archaeology in Jerusalem take responsibility for excavating the cave. During the course of one season Dorothy Garrod, with a team of local workers, placed a trench in the central chamber, as well as a small sounding in Chamber III. She identified an archaeological sequence which included a Late "Levallois-Mousterian" layer. It also included a Mesolithic layer that she subsequently named "Natufian". This was the first time that a Natufian layer had been found as part of a stratified deposit. This layer contained charcoal traces and a previously unknown microlithic stone tool industry characterized by crescent-shaped lunates. Garrod's team found worked bone objects. The fauna was dominated by gazelle, and also included the domestic dog. The remains of 45 human skeletons, mostly fragmentary, allowed insights into a range of distinctive mortuary practices. Recent investigations have identified what are believed to be Neanderthal remains, together with Nubian Levallois knapping tools previously thought to be specific to homo sapiens.

Related sites
Shuqba cave falls within the broader prehistoric landscape of the Wadi en-Natuf. While most of the lithic material in the immediate (1-km) survey area along the wadi's north bank is concentrated around the cave, debitage has been found at a small natural terrace 200 m south of the cave. Surface collection suggests that this material derives from the cave and from the 1928 spoil, the bulk of which has been washed down the slope. A terrace is visible today, but it was constructed as part of modern agricultural practices.

Recent developments
The area has been added to the 2013 UNESCO "tentative list" for possible designation as a World Heritage Site.

The Wadi en-Natuf and Shuqba Cave are currently under threat due to Israeli road building, decay, lack of protection, and extensive garbage dumping. The Israeli authorities have built a huge bypass road through the Wadi en-Natuf to connect Israeli settlements. They have also built an exit ramp from the bypass to allow garbage trucks to dump trash in the valley. A wall was also built to separate the cave from the nearby Palestinian village of Shuqba.

References

Bibliography

 (p. 196)

1924 archaeological discoveries
Natufian sites
Ramallah and al-Bireh Governorate
Archaeological sites in the West Bank
Caves of the State of Palestine
Archaeological type sites